C10 is an untarred highway in southern Namibia. It starts in ǀAi-ǀAis and ends at the Namibia–South Africa border where the road changes into the R358 road at Onseepkans. The road travels  past from Karasburg, which can be accessed by the M21. This also can be used to get onto the B3 road.

References

Roads in Namibia
ǁKaras Region
Namibia–South Africa border crossings